2015 Cambodian League is the 31st season of the Cambodian League. Contested by 12 clubs, it operates on a system of promotion and relegation with Cambodia Division 1 League. With 12 teams playing 22 games each totaling 132 games in the season. With the newcomer Abilrex Niigata  from Japan. However, Albirex has announced that they won't participate in 2015 Cambodian League due to financial crisis and replaced by CMAC United.

Boeung Ket Angkor who finished top of the regular season also qualified for the Mekong Club Championship.

The end of the season was mired in match-fixing claims by Phnom Penh Crown who claimed that several players of the club had under performed. They announced these claims with only the two-legged playoff final remaining.

Teams

 Asia Europe United
 Boeung Ket Angkor
 Build Bright United
 Cambodian Tiger 
 CMAC United
 Kirivong Sok Sen Chey 
 Nagaworld
 National Defense Ministry
 National Police Commissary
 Phnom Penh Crown
 Svay Rieng
 Western Phnom Penh
Source:

Personnel and sponsoring

Foreign players

The number of foreign players is restricted to five per team. A team can use three foreign players on the field in each game and one as substitution..

Stadiums and locations

League table

Playoffs

Semi-finals

First leg

Second leg

3rd place

Boeung Ket Angkor won 6-4 on aggregate.

Final

Top scorers

Clean sheets

Awards

References

C-League seasons
Cambodia
Cambodia
1